Dendrobium aphyllum, commonly known as the hooded orchid or 兜唇石斛 (dou chun shi hu) is a species of orchid native to Bangladesh, southern China, the eastern Himalayas, and Indochina.

References

aphyllum
Orchids of Asia
Flora of East Himalaya
Flora of West Himalaya
Flora of Indo-China
Orchids of Assam
Orchids of Bangladesh
Orchids of Myanmar
Orchids of China
Orchids of Malaysia
Orchids of Nepal
Flora of Peninsular Malaysia
Plants described in 1795